Gusti Sandria (born 6 August 1995) is an Indonesian professional footballer who plays as a full-back for Liga 2 club Persipal Palu.

Club career 
Gusti start his junior career with PSDS Deli Serdang then with PS Bintang Jaya Asahan and strengthen the PON Sumut teams in 2016. In 2017, he joined PSMS Medan who competed in Liga 2. He with his club managed to become runner-up 2017 Liga 2 and got promotion to 2018 Liga 1.

Honours

Club 
PSMS Medan
 Liga 2 runner-up: 2017
 Piala Presiden Fourth place: 2018

References

External links 
 
 Gusti Sandria at Liga Indonesia

1995 births
Indonesian footballers
PSMS Medan players
Bali United F.C. players
Association football defenders
Living people
Sportspeople from North Sumatra
21st-century Indonesian people